Bayard Rustin High School may refer to:

West Chester Rustin High School, Pennsylvania
Bayard Rustin High School for the Humanities, New York City